USS Holder (DE-401) was an  built for the United States Navy during World War II. Named for Lieutenant (junior grade) Randolph Mitchell Holder (a naval aviator who was reported missing during the Battle of Midway), she was the first of two U.S. Naval vessels to bear the name.

History
Holder was launched by Brown Shipbuilding of Houston, Texas, 27 November 1943; sponsored by Annette Holder, mother of Lieutenant (junior grade) Holder; and commissioned 18 January 1944. After completion of her shakedown cruise, Holder departed 24 March escorting a convoy bound for Mediterranean ports. Proceeding along the coast of Algeria the convoy was followed 10 and 11 April by German planes and just before midnight 11 April it was attacked by torpedo bombers. Holder and the other escorts immediately opened fire and began making smoke, but a torpedo struck the escort vessel amidships on the port side, causing two heavy explosions. Though fires spread and flooding was serious, Holders crew remained at their guns to drive off the attackers without damage to the convoy. Alert damage control kept the ship seaworthy and she arrived in tow at Oran for repairs. There it was decided to tow her to New York, where she arrived safely 9 June 1944.

Holder decommissioned at New York Navy Yard 13 September 1944, and was struck from the Naval Vessel Register 23 September 1944. A 95'-long section of the stern portion of Holders hull was used to repair ; the remainder was sold for scrap to John A. Witte, Staten Island, New York on 19 June 1947.

The bell of the ship is on display inside the museum ship USS Slater.

Honors
Holder received one battle star for World War II service.

See also
 List of U.S. Navy losses in World War II

References

External links
 USS Holder official website
 U-Boat Archive U-371
 NavSource.org - DE-401

Edsall-class destroyer escorts
World War II frigates and destroyer escorts of the United States
Ships built in Houston
1943 ships
Maritime incidents in April 1944